was a Sōtō Zen master who held many positions in his lifetime, including 75th Abbot of Eiheiji in Japan, Abbot of Zenshuji in Los Angeles, California, and President of Komazawa University.

He was also a strong supporter of the Japanese Imperial Army.

References

Soto Zen Buddhists
Zen Buddhist abbots
Komazawa University alumni
1889 births
1979 deaths
Japanese Zen Buddhists
Japanese scholars of Buddhism
20th-century Buddhist monks
People from Gifu Prefecture